Daizy is an artificial intelligence firm that aims to democratize the tools of the trade for next generation investors through risk and sustainability insights and transparency.

History
Daizy was founded as Vesti.AI by the renowned artist and engineer, Jonty Hurwitz, in 2018. The company had its initial focus on conversational AI and had its analytics and infographics engines developed within its first year.

In 2020, Daizy was joined by its current CEO, Deborah Yang. By this time, Yang had already ranked among Financial News' "100 Most Influential Women in European Finance" for six consecutive years, from 2013 to 2018.

Yang and Hurwitz gathered their team of experts in the fields of risk analysis, sustainability, and fintech. The company also develops tools that help investors with actionable information in fields such as sustainability (ESG) and risk.

In the first half of 2021, beta mobile apps of the company's main product were launched for both iOS in March and Android in June. Conversational AI capabilities remain available in the app through chatbot functionality.

Awards
Winner of the Best AI-Enabled Sustainable Investment Platform 2021.
Nominated for the Benzinga Global Fintech Awards [in the Best Financial Literacy Tool category].

References

Companies established in 2018